"Buat Selamanya" is a Malay pop ballad by Hill. It is written by Amalina Abdullah and Bahri Hj. Ibrahim. The song was released exclusively in Brunei in March 2010. It was a Top 20 hit on Brunei's Kristal FM chart and reached number 1 on the Pelangi FM chart.

Hill's first performance of this song was at the music video premiere for his debut single "Stay in the Middle" in Brunei on 20 February 2010.

Background and theme

'Buat selamanya' is 'forever' when translated into English. The song is about a love that lasts for all time.

The song is made up of only Hill's vocals and an acoustic guitar.

Music video

The music video, directed by Daryl Prince, is a simple black and white video with Hill singing into a microphone.

Charts

References

2010 singles
Pop ballads
Hill Zaini songs
2010 songs